is a Japanese manga series written and illustrated by Hideo Shinkai. It was serialized in Shueisha's Weekly Shōnen Jump magazine from February to September 2022; as of October 2022, its chapters have been collected into three volumes.

Publication
Written and illustrated by Hideo Shinkai, the series was serialized in Shueisha's Weekly Shōnen Jump magazine from February 21 to September 5, 2022. As of October 2022, the series' individual chapters have been collected into three tankōbon volumes.

Viz Media and Manga Plus are publishing the series in English simultaneously with the Japanese release.

Volume list

Reception
Ryoko Fukuda from Real Sound offered praise for the characters and artwork. Steven Blackburn from Screen Rant also offered praise, calling the series emotional.

References

External links
  
 

Romance anime and manga
Science fiction anime and manga
Shōnen manga
Shueisha manga
Viz Media manga